Mohd. Tahir Khan (born 15 August 1975) is an Indian politician for the Sultanpur (Lok Sabha constituency) in Uttar Pradesh and currently he is Samajwadi Party MLA from Isauli seat.

External links
 Official biographical sketch in Parliament of India website

1975 births
Living people
People from Sultanpur, Uttar Pradesh
India MPs 2004–2009
Bahujan Samaj Party politicians from Uttar Pradesh
Lok Sabha members from Uttar Pradesh
Uttar Pradesh MLAs 2022–2027
Samajwadi Party politicians from Uttar Pradesh